The eleventh Mindrolling Trichen (pronunciation: Mìn-drolling), Trichen Jurme Kunzang Wangyal  (January 1, 1930, Lumo-ra, Kham, Tibet – February 9, 2008, Dehra Dun, India) was a lama of the Nyingma-school, the oldest school of Tibetan Buddhism and had been responsible for the administrative affairs for the school in exile as the ceremonial head of the lineage. He is generally regarded as one of the greatest Tibetan masters.

Biography
Trichen Jurme Kunzang Wangyal was born in Lumo-ra in Kham (East-Tibet) and his father was the tenth Mindrolling Trichen.  After his father died the family went to Central Tibet and he started his education in the monastery. When he was 18 he went into retreat, lonesome meditation in a cave, and spend a total of fourteen years in retreat during his education. He continued his education with Dzongsar Khyentse Chökyi Lodrö. During this period, he fell in love and married. Within Buddhism celibacy is only a requirement for ordained monks and nuns. Some lamas of the Nyingma lineage are not monks and are married. He excelled in his studies and discovered the terma (hidden treasure) of the Compassionate One, "Jigten Wangchuk Pema Garwang." As a Tertön, he was therefore instructed to pass the teachings on eleven times to fortunate and worthy students.

In 1959 he escaped from Tibet and arrived in India where he was installed as the Eleventh Mindrolling Trichen in 1962. In the years that followed he worked with many other lamas like Dudjom Rinpoche, Dilgo Khyentse Rinpoche and the 16th Karmapa, who previously received his education from his father. In 1976 he and his family moved to Dehra Dun in order to oversee the building of the Mindrolling monastery.

Mindrolling Trichen is the father of Khandro Rinpoche, a female lama with a substantial following in the west. He has been renowned as one of the greatest mahasiddhas in recent history and a direct emanation of Padmasambhava. 

At the age of 78 years, in the evening of the 3rd day of the 1st month of Miracles, without even the slightest discomfort, Kyabje Mindrolling Trichen Jurme Kunzang Wangyal died at his home in India.

Head of the Nyingma school

In 2003, the government of Tibet-in-exile asked him to become responsible for the administrative affairs for the  Nyingma- school as one of the main throne holders, taking over for the retiring Penor Rinpoche. The Nyingma school has always been decentralised, and the position of "head of the school" was established only in the wake of the Tibetan diaspora. However, the lamas selected to fill this role are held in the very highest esteem by the lineage.

See also
 Mindrolling Monastery

References

External links
The Parinirvana of Kyabje Mindrolling Trichen Rinpoche
Mindrolling Dedicated to Vajrayana Dharma Activities

1930 births
2008 deaths
Nyingma lamas
Tibetan Buddhists from Tibet
Rinpoches
Tertöns
Tibetan Buddhists from India
Tibetan emigrants to India